Zelyony Island may refer to:

 Zelyony Island (Kuril Islands), an uninhabited island in the Kuril Island chain, Sakhalin Oblast, Russia
 Zelyony Island (Rostov-on-Don), river island situated in the lower reaches of the Don River, Rostov Oblast, Russia

See also
 Zelyony Ostrov, a village in Astrakhan Oblast, Russia